This is a complete filmography of Betty Grable, an American actress, dancer, and singer. As a major contract star for 20th Century-Fox during the 1940s and 1950s, she starred in a succession of musicals and romantic comedies.

Grable began her career in 1929 at age twelve, after which she was fired from a contract when it was learned she signed up under false identification. She made her film debut in Happy Days (1929) as an unbilled extra appearing in blackface. Grable had contracts with RKO Radio Pictures and Paramount Pictures during the 1930s, and she starred in roles as college students in a string of B-movies. In the campus musical Pigskin Parade (1936), she received positive reviews, but her performance was overshadowed by newcomer Judy Garland.

She eventually came to prominence in the Broadway musical Du Barry Was a Lady (1939) and signed an exclusive long-term contract with 20th Century-Fox. After replacing Alice Faye in Down Argentine Way (1940), she became the studio's biggest asset throughout the following decade, starring in a series of commercially successful musicals and comedies, often co-starring with renowned leading men, including Victor Mature, Don Ameche, John Payne, Tyrone Power, and Dan Dailey. Between 1941 and 1951, she was consistently listed in the "Top Ten Moneymaking Stars Poll", sometimes as the only female on the list. In 1943 and 1944, she was the number one box office draw in the United States. Her famous 1943 pin-up became one of the most-identified photographs of World War II.

The majority of Grable's films followed the traditional backstage musical genre point-by-point. Plot point one: boy meets girl; plot point two: boy teams up with girl; plot point three: girl dumps boy; and plot point four: boy and girl reunite in time for the finale. Despite the often similar storylines, her films remained immensely popularity for over a decade, some of them becoming the year's highest-grossing films, including Springtime in the Rockies (1942), Coney Island (1943), The Dolly Sisters (1945), and When My Baby Smiles at Me (1948). Two of her greatest successes were Pin Up Girl (1944) (which showcased her famous pin-up) and Mother Wore Tights (1947). The 1949 western comedy The Beautiful Blonde from Bashful Bend was Grable's first film in nine years to lose money financially.

The changing tastes of the public and the waning popularity of the musical genre in the early 1950s contributed to Grable's career decline. Although Wabash Avenue and My Blue Avenue (both 1950) were successes, some of her films thereafter failed to live up to their hype. How to Marry a Millionaire (1953), a comedy about three models scheming to marry wealthy husbands, was one of her last big successes for Fox. She co-starred with newcomer Marilyn Monroe and Lauren Bacall, and while tabloids publicized a rivalry between the three women, they nevertheless became close friends. In 1953, she declined to renew her contract with Fox, hoping to revitalize her stage career. This move was not successful and, after falling into bankruptcy, Grable returned to the studio for what would be her final film: the satirical comedy How to Be Very, Very Popular (1955), which parodied her earlier films in some aspects.

Credits

Film appearances

Box Office ranking
For a number of years exhibitors voted Grable among the most popular stars in the country in the Quigley Moving Picture Poll.
1941 – 16th (US)
1942 – 8th (US)
1943 – 1st (US), 5th (UK international stars)
1944 – 4th (US), 2nd (UK international stars)
1945 – 4th (US), 6th (UK international stars)
1946 – 9th (US)
1947 – 2nd (US)
1948 – 2nd (US)
1949 – 7th (US), 10th (UK international stars)
1950 – 4th (US)
1951 – 3rd (US)
1952 – 20th (US)

Short subjects

 Crashing Hollywood (1931) — Frances Dean
 Ex-Sweeties (1931)
 Once a Hero (1931)
 Lady! Please! (1932)
 Hollywood Luck (1932)
 The Flirty Sleepwalker (1932)
 Hollywood Lights (1932)
 Over the Counter (1932)
 Air Tonic (1933)
 School for Romance (1934)
 Love Detectives (1934)
 Elmer Steps Out (1934)
 Business Is a Pleasure (1934)
 Susie's Affairs (1934)
 Ferry-Go-Round (1934)

 This Band Age (1935)
 The Spirit of 1976 (1935)
 A Night at the Biltmore Bowl (1935)
 Drawing Rumors (1935)
 A Quiet Fourth (1935)
 Screen Snapshots Series 15, No. 11 (1936)
 Sunkist Stars at Palm Springs (1936)
 Screen Snapshots Series 16, No. 7 (1937)
 Screen Snapshots Series 16, No. 10 (1937)
 Screen Snapshots Series 18, No. 4 (1938)
 Hedda Hopper's Hollywood No. 1 (1941)
 The All-Star Bond Rally (1945)
 Hollywood Park (1946)
 Screen Snapshots: Hollywood Shower of Stars (1955)

Stage work
Du Barry Was a Lady (1939)
Guys and Dolls (1962; 1968)
Hello, Dolly! (1965–1967)
Born Yesterday (1968–1970; 1973)
Belle Starr (1969)

References

Actress filmographies
American filmographies